Pierre Foretier (January 12, 1738 – December 3, 1815) was a fur trader, seigneur and official in Lower Canada.

He was born in Montreal in 1738, the son of a shoemaker who died when Pierre was nine. He became a merchant supplying goods to fur traders. In 1764, he married Thérèse Legrand, daughter of a Montreal merchant. He owned his own store and operated a store for his father-in-law. He partnered with Joseph Périnault in several fur trading expeditions. In 1765, with Périnault, he purchased a large part of the sub-fief of Closse and the seigneury of Île-Bizard, later buying out his partner and purchasing the remainder of these properties. After 1767, he operated on his own before taking on Jean Orillat as a partner in 1774. Foretier also purchased property in the faubourg Saint-Laurent in Montreal. During the American invasion of 1775–6, he helped supply Canadian forces, despite having his home occupied by an American colonel and his entourage.

He was named a justice of the peace in 1779. Foretier was among those who lobbied for constitutional reform in the province; he ran unsuccessfully for a seat in the legislative assembly in 1792. Foretier later served in the militia, serving as colonel from 1804 until his death at Montreal in 1815.

His daughter Marie-Amable married Denis-Benjamin Viger; his daughter Marie-Élizabeth married judge Louis-Charles Foucher. His grandson Hugues Heney later represented Montreal East in the legislative assembly and served in the province's Executive Council.

External links
Biography at the Dictionary of Canadian Biography Online

1738 births
1815 deaths
Canadian fur traders